Wasantha Aluwihare (born 16 July 1962) is a Sri Lankan politician from Matale and a member of the Parliament of Sri Lanka belonging to the United National Party. He is the current  State Minister of Agriculture in the United National Party led unity government,  He was earlier the Chief Minister of the Central Province of Sri Lanka. He is the son of Alick Aluwihare and brother of Ranjith Aluwihare. He also served as the Deputy Minister of Mahaweli Development and Environment before given the state ministry.

References

External links
 Official biographical sketch in Parliament of Sri Lanka website

Sri Lankan Buddhists
Living people
1962 births
United National Party politicians
Members of the 14th Parliament of Sri Lanka
Members of the 15th Parliament of Sri Lanka
Chief Ministers of Central Province, Sri Lanka
Deputy ministers of Sri Lanka
Sinhalese politicians